ArenaBowl XXX was the championship game of the 2017 Arena Football League season. The game was broadcast on AFLNow, Twitter and WPVI-TV. It was played between the Philadelphia Soul and Tampa Bay Storm at the Wells Fargo Center in Philadelphia. It was the Soul's third ArenaBowl championship and fifth appearance while it was the Storm's tenth appearance. The Soul set an ArenaBowl record for largest comeback victory after overcoming a 20–7 deficit.

Box score

Source:

References

030
2017 Arena Football League season
2017 in American television
August 2017 sports events in the United States
Events in Philadelphia